Constance was the name of an unincorporated community in Anoka County, Minnesota, United States.  The site of Constance village, now abandoned, is within the present boundaries of the city of Andover.

History
Constance was founded in section 13 of the former Grow Township prior to 1897, and had a post office from 1897 to 1955.  Constance formerly had a station along the former Burlington Northern Railroad.  Little trace of Constance itself remains, and Grow Township incorporated as the city of Andover in 1973, but Constance Boulevard remains a main two-lane roadway in the local area.

Notes

Neighborhoods in Minnesota
Geography of Anoka County, Minnesota